This is a list of academic journals published by Hindawi.

A

B

C

D

E

G

H

I

J

L

M

N

O

P

Q

R

S

T

U

V

W

References

External links
List of journals published by Hindawi

Hindawi